The Pitt family were an English aristocratic family whose members included the Earls of Chatham, the Earls of Londonderry and the Barons Camelford. The family produced two British Prime Ministers: William Pitt, 1st Earl of Chatham, and his son William Pitt the Younger.

The family's fortunes were boosted greatly by Thomas Pitt who while serving as Governor of Madras acquired the Regent Diamond and sold it on at a great profit in 1717.

References

 
English families
Noble families of the United Kingdom
People from Dorset
People from Hampshire